Arnulf Pilhatsch (9 January 1925 – 1 August 2000) was an Austrian athlete. He competed in the men's high jump at the 1948 Summer Olympics.

His son Alexander Pilhatsch was an Olympic swimmer for Austria.

References

1925 births
2000 deaths
Athletes (track and field) at the 1948 Summer Olympics
Austrian male high jumpers
Olympic athletes of Austria
People from Südoststeiermark District
Sportspeople from Styria